NBQX (2,3-dioxo-6-nitro-7-sulfamoyl-benzo[f]quinoxaline) is an antagonist of the AMPA receptor.

NBQX blocks AMPA receptors in micromolar concentrations (~10–20 μM) and also blocks kainate receptors. In experiments, it is used to counter glutamate excitotoxicity. NBQX was found to have anticonvulsant activity in rodent seizure models.

As the disodium salt, NBQX is soluble in water at high concentrations (at least up to 100 mM).

See also
CNQX
DNQX
Fanapanel (MPQX)
Quinoxalinedione

References

AMPA receptor antagonists
Kainate receptor antagonists
Glycine receptor antagonists
Sulfonamides
Nitronaphthalenes
Quinoxalines
Lactams
Quinones
Nitrogen heterocycles